The Parable of the Rich Fool  is a parable of Jesus which appears in The Gospel of Luke. It depicts the futility of the belief that wealth can secure prosperity or a good life.

This parable has been depicted by several artists, including Rembrandt, Jan Luyken, James Tissot, and David Teniers the Younger.

Narrative 
The parable is introduced by a member of the crowd listening to Jesus, who tries to enlist Jesus' help in a family financial dispute:

In Luke's account Jesus then responds with the parable:

An abbreviated version of this parable also appears in the non-canonical Gospel of Thomas (Saying 63).

Interpretation
The rich farmer in this parable is portrayed negatively, as an example of greed. By replacing his existing barn, he avoids using agricultural land for storage purposes, thus maximising his income, as well as allowing him to wait for a price increase before selling. St. Augustine comments that the farmer was "planning to fill his soul with excessive and unnecessary feasting and was proudly disregarding all those empty bellies of the poor. He did not realize that the bellies of the poor were much safer storerooms than his barns."

Arland J. Hultgren comments that the parable "provides an example of what one ought not to be like. The person whose identity is tied up with his or her possessions, status, and/or achievements—and is driven by acquiring them—can so easily end up unaware of the call of God and the need of the neighbor." The farmer's conversation with himself is self-centred: first-person pronouns occur 11 times.

The farmer's foolishness lies particularly in the fact that wealth cannot guarantee the future: the Day of Judgment arrives sooner than he expects.

Ellicott's Commentary notes the difference between the fool's approach and the psalmist's:

Return unto thy rest, O my soul; for the LORD hath dealt bountifully with thee.

"The psalmist's repose is not the worldling's serenity nor the sensualist's security, but the repose of the quiet conscience and the trusting heart".

Cornelius a Lapide in his great commentary explains the parable, writing,
The meaning is, This is a matter of the courts which dispose of secular questions: it has no part in Me, who teach and dispense a heavenly heritage. Christ does not here deny that He has judicial power, for He was the King of kings and the Lord of lords; but He wished to use His power over a covetous man to cure him of his greed, and to teach him to prefer heavenly to earthly things, and to give way willingly to them, according to His own words, 6:29, “From him that takes away thy cloak withhold not thy coat also.” “He rightly sets aside earthly things,” says S. Ambrose, “who came down to us for heavenly ones. Hence this brother is rebuked not undeservedly, for he would fain have occupied the dispenser of heavenly things with those of earth.” At the same time He taught that ecclesiastics and spiritual persons ought not to meddle with secular things, but to employ themselves in divine ones, as St. Paul says, 2 Tim 2:4, "No soldier on service entangleth himself in the affairs of this life."

John McEvilly comments on the second part, writing "The rich man thus pondered secretly in his own mind; for, “he thought within himself” (v. 17). But, his thoughts were heard and examined in Heaven, which is not slow in pronouncing judgment on him. “But God said to him,” either by some secret inspiration, or some sudden mortal stroke, sending him a mortal disease, which was taking him out of life and thus showing his folly; or by an angel, “thou fool,” while thou hast not a day which thou canst call thine own, thou promisest thyself many years, on which all thy calculations of long happiness are based. Such is the judgment, not of man, but of Divine wisdom regarding him, and, indeed, it is not difficult even for man, enlightened by faith, to pronounce the same."

See also
 Gospel of Luke: Chapter 12
 Life of Jesus in the New Testament
 Ministry of Jesus

References

External links 
 

Rich Fool, Parable of the
Gospel of Luke
Simple living